The following list enumerates and expands on notable sea stacks, including former sea stacks that no longer exist.

Antarctica
 Denais Stack, King George Island 
 Cutler Stack, Livingston Island
 Neptune's Bellow, Deception Island
 The Monolith, Buckle Island

Asia
 Po Pin Chau, High Island, Hong Kong
 Tri Brata, Kamchatka, Russia
 Ko Tapu, Phang Nga Bay, Thailand
 Bako National Park, Sarawak, Borneo, Malaysia
 Lot's Wife or Sofugan, Japan (isolated volcanic stack, not a coastal stack)
 Pigeon's Rock, Lebanon

Australia
 Ball's Pyramid, Lord Howe Island Group (isolated volcanic stack, not a coastal stack)
 Nobby Islet, Kangaroo Island, South Australia
 The Twelve Apostles on the Great Ocean Road, Victoria
 The Nobbies on Phillip Island, Victoria
 The Totem Pole in Tasmania

Europe
(coastal countries only)

Croatia
 Cape Kamenjak

Faroe Islands
 Drangarnir
 Risin og Kellingin
 Stakkurin

France
 Les Aiguilles de Port-Coton, Belle-Île
 L'Aiguille, Étretat, Seine-Maritime
 Les Jumeaux, Hendaye

Germany
 Lange Anna on Heligoland

Greece
Megalos Kalogeros
Mikros Kalogeros

Iceland
 Hvítserkur, Vatnsnes
 Reynisdrangar, Vík í Mýrdal

Ireland
 Cnoc na Mara, Donegal
 Branaunmore, County Clare
 Dún Briste, Ballycastle, County Mayo
 An Searrach, Kinard, Dingle, County Kerry

Isle of Man
 Sugarloaf Rock, Isle of Man

Italy
 Faraglioni, Capri
 Baia dei Mergoli, Mattinata, southern Italy
 Torre Sant'Andrea, southern Italy
 Acitrezza, Sicily
 Faraglioni, Scopello, Trapani, Sicily
 Isola del Giglio, Tuscany
 Nebida and Masua, Iglesias, south-western Sardinia
 Scoglio dell'Ulivo, Palmi
 Gargano Promontory, Zagare Bay, Apulia

Portugal
 Praia da Dona Ana and Ponta da Piedade, Lagos
 Praia da Marinha, Lagoa, Algarve

Russia
 Sail Rock, Krasnodar Krai

Spain
 El Dedo de Dios, Canary Islands

United Kingdom

 Am Buachaille, Sutherland, Scotland
 Bedruthan Steps, Cornwall, England
 Duncansby Stacks, Caithness, Scotland
 Dunnicaer, Aberdeenshire (stack with remains of Pictish hill fort)
 The Needles, Isle of Wight, England
 Old Harry Rocks, Dorset, England
 Old Man of Hoy, Orkney, Scotland
 Old Man of Stoer, Scotland
 Rockall, North Atlantic (isolated volcanic stack, not a coastal stack)
 Stac an Armin and Stac Lee, St Kilda, Scotland
 Stac Dhomnuill Chaim, Isle of Lewis, Scotland
 Yesnaby Castle, Orkney, Scotland
 South Stack, Anglesey, Wales

North America

Canada
 The Big Flowerpot, Flowerpot Island, Lake Huron
 Three Sisters, Eatonville, Nova Scotia
 Percé Rock, Percé, Quebec
 Hopewell Rocks, Hopewell Cape, New Brunswick
 Siwash Rock, Vancouver, British Columbia

Mexico
 Cabo San Lucas, Baja California Sur

United States
 Goat Rock, California
 Turnip Rock, Michigan
 Haystack Rock, Cannon Beach, Oregon

Oceania

Easter Island
 Motu Kau Kau, Easter Island

References

 
Sea stacks